Allegory of Peace or Triumph of Peace is a 1652 oil-on-canvas painting by Dutch artist Jan Lievens. The painting represents the 1648 Treaty of Münster and it is a depiction of Minerva, the goddess of wisdom, crowning Pax the goddess of peace.

History
Allegory of Peace is a paining by Jan Lievens and it was completed in 1652. The paining is in the Rijksmuseum in Amsterdam. It is an allegorical celebration of the Treaty of Münster. The 1648 treaty ended decades of conflict between Spain and the Netherlands.

Description
It is a  ×  oil-on-canvas painting and it weighs {{cvt|44|kg|lb}. The painting shows a seated female which represents peace and she is being crowned with a laurel wreath by a woman who is clad in Armour. Under her feet she is stepping on War. On her left women have baskets of fruit and Putto is playing a drum. On her right two other putti put chain's on War's feet. On her right there are more putti and women with flowers. The painting is a depiction of Minerva, the goddess of wisdom, crowning Pax the goddess of peace who holds an olive branch. Mars, God of War is the one in chains under the feet of Pax.

Reception
David Charles Preyer stated that the composition of the painting is awkward. In the painting Peace is squinting but the beauty of the small angels help to redeem the painting. The National Gallery of Art, in Washington D.C. states that the painting has complex iconography. Ken Johnson (art critic) writing for The New York Times said it "falls far short" and it a "big, sugary allegory" with winged putti fluttering about.

References

1652 paintings
Paintings of Minerva
Allegorical paintings by Dutch artists
Paintings by Jan Lievens